The 4 Hours of Red Bull Ring (originally known as the 500 km Zeltweg) was an endurance sports car event held near Spielberg, Austria.  Originally based at the Zeltweg Airfield, the race moved to the Österreichring and was lengthened to a 1000 km distance and there it continued to be a regular event in the World Sportscar Championship until 1976.

History

In 1963, Formula One held its first exhibition event at the Zeltweg Airfield, located in Styria.  The airfield had been modified in 1958 to allow it to be used for motorsports, using the runway and taxiways for straights.  Following the successful event, the Austrian Grand Prix joined the Formula One calendar for the 1964 season.  However complaints from drivers about the poor surface led to the FIA abandoning the circuit before a 1965 event could be held.  Left without a major event, the organizers turned to the World Sportscar Championship and offered a 500 km event to take place starting in 1966.  This event proved more successful due to the ability of the sportscars to handle the bumpy surface better than a Formula One car.

In 1969, due to demands once again from racers for a better circuit, the Österreichring was built in the mountains less than a mile from Zeltweg Airfield.  Once the new circuit was completed, the sports car event moved to its permanent home.  Due to the freshness of the track, the organizers expanded the event to a 1000 km endurance.  The smoothness of the new racing surface allowed for greater reliability and greater ease in achieving the longer distance.  The high-speed nature of the layout also allowed for quick races, with some events running under five hours.  However, with rule changes in the evolved World Championship of Makes in 1976, the event became limited to a maximum of six hours due to the decrease in overall speed of the competitors.

The 1976 event also became the final 1000 km race at the Österreichring.  A second Austrian race was added to the separate World Sportscar Championship, held at the smaller Salzburgring.  Due to safety concerns and a shrinking schedule, the Österreichring was dropped from the 1977 season, leaving the Salzburgring one final event before it too was abandoned, marking the final Austrian event in the World Sportscar Championship.

Following the rebuilding of the Österreichring into the new A1-Ring in 1997, the FIA GT Championship briefly resurrected the sportscar endurance race in a modified form.  A four-hour event was run in 1997 covering nearly 700 km, followed by 500 km races in 1998, 2000, and 2001.  The FIA chose not to return to the circuit after the 2001 event, and the A1-Ring was eventually partially torn down in 2004, until it was rebuilt as Red Bull Ring in 2011.

Winners

† - The 1975 event was scheduled for 1000 km, but was stopped after 600 km due to heavy rain.

External links
 Motor Racing Circuits Database - Zeltweg Airfield (1958-1968)
 Motor Racing Circuits Database - Österreichring (1969-1976)

 
Sports car races
Auto races in Austria
Zeltweg